The  (Latin, "ecclesiastical reservation") was a provision of  the Peace of Augsburg of 1555. Under this principle, the religion of the ruler would be the religion of the country and of its people, those being his possession by inheritance. 

But this same principle would have different consequences if applied in an ecclesiastical realm, such as one ruled by a prince-bishop or an abbot. Such a realm was structurally Catholic, and its ruler was elected or appointed within the Church, having no hereditary rights. 

The   declared that an ecclesiastical prince who converted to Lutheranism immediately forfeited his authority (which he had received within the Church) and the realm was not converted. His office became vacant and he would be replaced by a Catholic. The measure was inserted into the Peace by Imperial authority, as it was not supported by Protestants.  Nonetheless, the Protestants chose not to veto the measure and in return gained the  that protected Protestant knights and long-established Protestant cities and communities, including those in territories where  applied.

The measure was contested in 1583, when the Archbishop-Elector of Cologne, Gebhard Truchsess von Waldburg, converted to Protestantism, specifically to Calvinism, and tried to retain his office. In the resulting Cologne War, Gebhard was supported by the Dutch Republic and the Electorate of the Palatinate. But the war was eventually won by his Catholic replacement, Ernest of Bavaria, supported by his brother William V, Duke of Bavaria, and by Philip II of Spain. The Spanish army, commanded by the Duke of Parma, physically recovered the electoral territory.

The measure continued to be a grievance of Protestants. After the ascension of Matthias, Holy Roman Emperor, his new chancellor, Melchior Klesl, hoped to dissolve the religious alliances of the time — the Protestant Union and the Catholic League — and bring people of all faiths back under the authority of the Emperor.

See also
 Peace of Augsburg

References

Augsburg
Augsburg
Augsburg
1555 in the Holy Roman Empire
1583 in the Holy Roman Empire
1613 in the Holy Roman Empire
1555 treaties
1555 in Christianity